Tenia Vaeteru (born 9 February 1964) is a former New Zealand rugby union player. She debuted for the Black Ferns against the United States at RugbyFest 1990 at Christchurch, her other appearance was against the World XV's team.

References 

1964 births
Living people
New Zealand female rugby union players
New Zealand women's international rugby union players
New Zealand sportspeople of Cook Island descent